Nataliya Savchyn (born 18 January 1996) is a Ukrainian female handballer who plays as a left back for Gloria Bistrița and the Ukraine national team.

Achievements  
EHF Challenge Cup: 
Semifinalist: 2014, 2015

Ukrainian Super League: 
Winner: 2015, 2016, 2017, 2018, 2019 
Silver Medalist: 2014

Ukrainian Super Cup: 
Winner: 2016, 2017, 2018, 2019

Ukrainian Cup: 
Winner: 2016, 2017, 2019

Baltic League: 
Winner: 2018, 2020
Bronze Medalist: 2017

References
  

1996 births
Living people
Sportspeople from Ivano-Frankivsk
Ukrainian female handball players
Expatriate handball players  
Ukrainian expatriate sportspeople in Romania  
Ukrainian expatriate sportspeople in Hungary